Klapka may refer to:

People
 Dalimil Klapka, Czech actor
 György Klapka (1820–1892), Hungarian soldier
 Filip Klapka (born 1981), Czech footballer
 Rudolf Klapka, Czech footballer

Places
 Klapka, Poland, village in Poland